Devin Moore (born November 6, 1985) is a former American football running back and kick returner. He was signed by the Seattle Seahawks as an undrafted free agent in 2009. Moore graduated from Cardinal Ritter High School in Indianapolis, Indiana. He played college football at Wyoming.

Moore has also been a member of the Carolina Panthers and Indianapolis Colts. Moore was most recently a member of the Detroit Lions, but was cut before training camp in May 2013. Moore also played in the United Football League with the Las Vegas Locomotives.

Moore saw his only regular season play with the Indianapolis Colts, where he was primarily used for special teams and as a kick returner. 

As of November 2021, Moore is President of the National Football League Players Association Indianapolis Chapter.

Personal life
Moore is the son of Kevin and Shelia Moore. Kevin Moore died of Lung Cancer when Moore was 12. Moore is married to Whitney Moore and has 3 children.

Moore founded, and is CEO and President of Moore Surety Bonds Agency located in Indianapolis, Indiana.

References

External links
Wyoming Cowboys bio
Carolina Panthers bio
Seattle Seahawks bio
Detroit Lions bio
Indianapolis Colts bio

1985 births
Living people
Players of American football from Indianapolis
American football running backs
American football return specialists
Wyoming Cowboys football players
Seattle Seahawks players
Carolina Panthers players
Indianapolis Colts players
Detroit Lions players